Utaqqiurviarjuruluk (Inuktitut syllabics: ᐅᑕᖅᑭᐅᕐᕕᐊᕐᔪᕈᓗᒃ) formerly Ugpitimik Island is an uninhabited island in the Qikiqtaaluk Region of Nunavut, Canada. It is located at the mouth of Pangnirtung Fiord, in the Cumberland Sound, off Baffin Island's Cumberland Peninsula. Akulagok Island, Aupaluktok Island, Upajjana, Kekerten Island, Kekertukdjuak Island, Tesseralik Island, and Tuapait Island are in the vicinity.

References

Islands of Baffin Island
Islands of Cumberland Sound
Uninhabited islands of Qikiqtaaluk Region